The Biscuit Factory is a Contemporary art gallery in Newcastle upon Tyne. The Gallery opened in 2002 after undergoing major renovation work.   It is the largest commercial art, craft & design gallery in the UK.

The gallery's home is a former Victorian warehouse, constructed in 1870. Prior to 2002 the Building was used in the manufacturing of biscuits (hence the name The biscuit factory), changing its name over the years from The Tyne Biscuit Factory to the name Newcastle upon Tyne Biscuit Manufacturers.

References 

 The Biscuit Factory

Art museums and galleries in Tyne and Wear
Contemporary art galleries in England
Buildings and structures in Newcastle upon Tyne
Tourist attractions in Newcastle upon Tyne